Fitzgerald Hill is a hill,  high, standing west of Mount Bird between Fitzgerald Stream and Shell Glacier on Ross Island. It was mapped by the New Zealand Geological Survey Antarctic Expedition, 1958–59, and named by the New Zealand Antarctic Place-Names Committee for E.B. Fitzgerald, deputy leader of the expedition.

References 

Hills of Ross Island